Skjerstad is a village in Bodø Municipality in Nordland county, Norway.  The small village of Skjerstad sits at the mouth of the Misværfjorden, where it joins Skjerstadfjorden.  The village is also the location of Skjerstad Church.  The village was the namesake of the old Skjerstad Municipality which existed prior to 2005.

History
Skjerstad is possibly the place of execution of Raud den Rame by Olaf Tryggvason, and the location of the annual historical hoax play called "Ragnhilds Drøm" (Ragnhild's Dream).

Notable people
Gudmund Grimstad, an Olympic wrestler (1898–1970)

References

Bodø
Villages in Nordland
Populated places of Arctic Norway